The 1952 Singapore City Council election was the 2nd election to the Singapore City Council. It was held on 6 December 1952 to elect 6 of the 18 seats in the City Council.

Results

By constituency

References 

Singapore City Council elections
City Council election
Singapore City Council election
Singapore City Council election